The Hauptfriedhof in Karlsruhe is one of the oldest German communal rural cemeteries. In 1871, the first plans to build a new burial ground outside the city center began. The cemetery was laid out in 1874 by Josef Durm in the Rintheim district, east of the actual city, after the inner-city Alter Friedhof Karlsruhe in the Oststadt had become too small. The main cemetery has grown from its original size of 15.3 hectares in 1873 to over 34 hectares. The graves of more than 32,000 deceased are currently in the cemetery.

Structuring
Curved avenues of plane trees instead of rigid axes were part of the new conception of the park cemetery. While the representative monuments stood on the main paths, the simpler tombs were hidden behind hedges. The former crematorium, today a chapel for burials on a small scale, is elevated.

Since 2003, natural burials have been offered in an area called Mein letzter Garten ("my last garden").

There is a Muslim burial ground in the cemetery. An Orthodox and a Liberal Jewish cemetery with the graves of Otto Nachmann and his son, the former chairman of the Central Council of Jews in Germany, Werner Nachmann are separated.

Buildings
The entrance, which is reached from Haid-und-Neu-Straße after passing an avenue and several outbuildings, is designed in the style of a Roman triumphal arch. Behind the portal there is a courtyard based on the pattern of the Campo santo, which is closed off by the Renaissance-style crypt hall as well as the mortuary and the burial chapel. The ensemble is the first example of the Neo-Renaissance building in Baden and was restored at the beginning of the 21st century.

In 1903 the crematorium was built according to designs by August Stürzenacker. It is clad with reddish sandstone. With its neo-Romanesque design, it is considered the first crematorium to look like Christian sacred buildings; Until then, oriental architectural styles had been chosen for the type of burial, which the churches rejected. The building has been used as a small funeral hall since 2002. A new and more modern crematorium was put into operation in 1998.

The former resting place of the Bürklin family is also located in the cemetery. Today's Bürklin'sches Mausoleum was handed over to the city of Karlsruhe in 1963, which has been using it as a Columbarium since 1985.

Information center
At the entrance to the cemetery area is the information center of the Verein zur Pflege der Friedhofs- und Bestattungskultur Karlsruhe. The information center was opened in April 2002 and is located in the former waiting hall of the former Karlsruhe local railway, which led to Hagsfeld. The building was designed by the Karlsruhe architect Friedrich Beichel and was built in Art Nouveau between 1905 and 1906. The association sees itself as a contact point for people who have ideas, questions and concerns about the topics of cemetery, burial and death. The association also offers cemetery tours, exhibitions and lectures.

Famous persons
Over the years, a number of famous persons, some of whom were known far beyond the borders of Karlsruhe and the region, found their final resting place in the main cemetery in Karlsruhe. The best known among them is probably the inventor of the forerunner of the bicycle Karl Freiherr von Drais. Other prominent persons who were buried here included the poet and author Joseph Victor von Scheffel, the painter Hans Thoma and the composer and court music director Johann Wenzel Kalliwoda.

List of famous persons buried on the Hauptfriedhof Karlsruhe

A–D 
 Engelbert Arnold (1856–1911), Engineer
 Klaus Arnold (1928–2009), Painter and university professor
 Hermann Baisch (1846–1894), Painter
 Hermann Baumeister (1867–1944), Painter
 Reinhard Baumeister (1833–1917), Engineer
 Traugott Bender (1927–1979), Politician
 Hermann Billing (1867–1946), Architect
 Adolf Boettge (1848–1913), Music director and conductor of the 1st Baden Leib Grenadier Regiment No. 109
 Karl Braun (1902–1937), Motorcycle racer
 Hans Bunte (1848–1925), Chemist
 Luigi Colani (1928–2019), Designer
 Karl Delisle (1827–1909), Lawyer and politician
 Eduard Devrient (1801–1877), Actor, singer and theater director
 Ludwig Dill (1848–1940), Painter
 Edwin Dorner (1926–2012), Actor
 Karl Drais (1785–1851), The inventor of the balance bike (draisine)
 Arthur Drews (1865–1935), Philosopher and writer
 Josef Durm (1837–1919), Architect, construction officer and university professor
 Leopold Durm (1878–1918), Painter, doctor and son of Josef Durm

E–J 
 Carl Egler (1896–1982), Sculptor
 Ludwig Egler (1894–1965), Composer and writer
 Willi Egler (1887–1953), Painter
 Friedrich Engesser (1848–1931), Engineer
 Carl Engler (1842–1925), Chemist
 Wilhelm Engler (1880–1958), Lawyer
 Rudolf Fettweis (1882–1956),  Board of Directors of Badenwerk AG
 Kunigunde Fischer (1882–1967), Politician
 Hermann Föry (1879–1930), Sculptor
 Robert Gerwig (1820–1885), Railway engineer
 Franz Grashof (1826–1893), Mechanical engineer and university professor
 Franz Gurk (1898–1984), Lawyer and politician
 Josef Heinrich (1879–1955), Politician and Lord Mayor of Karlsruhe in 1945
 Johann Heinrich Jung-Stilling (1740–1817), Ophthalmologist, economist and writer
 Wilhelm Hempfing (1886–1948), Painter
 Julius Jolly (1823–1891), Baden politician, minister of state and head of government

K–Q 
 Johann Wenzel Kalliwoda (1801–1866), Composer
 Herbert Kitzel (1928–1978), Artist
 Wilhelm Klose (1830–1914), Painter and patron
 Günther Klotz (1911–1972) from 1952 to 1970 mayor of Karlsruhe
 Heinrich Köhler (1878–1949), Politician
 Vinzenz Lachner (1811–1893), Composer and conductor
 Hanne Landgraf (1914–2005), Politician
 Heinrich Lang (1824–1893), Architect
 Wilhelm Florentin Lauter (1821–1892), Mayor of Karlsruhe from 1870 to 1892
 Otto Lehmann (1855–1922), Physicist
 Carl Friedrich Lessing (1808–1880), Painter and director of the Grand Ducal Picture Gallery in Karlsruhe
 Wilhelm Lorenz (1842–1926), Manufacturer and designer
 Wilhelm Lübke (1826–1893), Art historian
 Jakob Malsch (1809–1896), Mayor of Karlsruhe from 1848 to 1870
 Karl Mathy (1807–1868), Journalist and politician
 Heinrich Meidinger (1831–1905), Physicist
 Willi Müller-Hufschmid (1890–1966), Painter
 Theodor Nöldeke (1836–1930), Orientalist
 Wilhelm Nokk (1832–1903), Lawyer and politician
 Friedrich Ostendorf (1871–1915) Architect, architectural theorist and university professor

R–T 
 Ferdinand Redtenbacher (1809–1863), Engineer and scientist
 Theodor Rehbock (1864–1950), Engineer
 Adam Remmele (1877–1951), Politician
 Toni Rothmund (1877–1956), Poet and journalist
 Carl Wilhelm Ernst Schäfer (1844–1908), Architect and university professor
 Josef Schmitt (1874–1939), President of Baden
 Karl Schnetzler (1846–1906), Mayor of Karlsruhe from 1892 to 1906
 Gustav Schönleber (1851–1917), Painter
 Robert Schwebler (1926–2012), Economist
 Harald Siebenmorgen (1949–2020), Director of the Baden State Museum
 Karl Siegrist (1862–1944), from 1906 to 1919 mayor of Karlsruhe
 Carl Steinhäuser (1813–1879), Sculptor
 Emil Sutor (1888–1974), Sculptor
 Ulli Thiel (1943–2014), Teacher and peace activist
 Hans Thoma (1839–1924), Painter and graphic artist
 Gabriele Thome (1951–2003), Professor of Philology
 Fritz Trautz (1917–2001), Historian
 Wilhelm Trübner (1851–1917), Painter and professor at the Karlsruhe Art Academy
 Ludwig Turban der Jüngere (1857–1930), Board member of Baden

U–Z 
 Hermann Veit (1897–1973), Lawyer and politician
 Hermann Volz (1847–1941), Sculptor
 Arthur von Brauer (1845–1926), Politician and lawyer
 Berthold von Freydorf (1820–1878), General
 Karl Wilhelm Eugen von Freydorf (1781–1854), Officer and Minister of War
 Rudolf von Freydorf (1819–1882), Politician
 Edgar von Gierke (1877–1945), Pathologist
 Egon von Neindorff (1923–2004), Riding master
 Joseph Victor von Scheffel (1826–1886), Poet
 Friedrich von Weech (1837–1905), Privy councilor and archivist
 Karl Weltzien (1813–1870), Chemiker
 Karl Wolf (1912–1975), Athlete
 Ernst Würtenberger (1868–1934), Painter
 Wolfgang Zeidler (1924–1987), Judge and President at the Federal Constitutional Court

Honor graves
On the site of the Hauptfriedhof there are also the Ehrengräber of the two lawyers working in Karlsruhe Ludwig Marum (1882–1934) and Reinhold Frank (1896–1945). Both men were victims of the Nazi regime and were each honored with their own memorial stone.

See also
 Lists of cemeteries

Pictures

Literature
 Karl Zahn: Gräber, Grüfte, Trauerstätten. Der Karlsruher Hauptfriedhof. Karlsruhe 2001, ISBN 3-88190-282-1
 Gerd Otto-Rieke: Gräber in Karlsruhe – Menschen, die uns bewegten. Geschichte entdecken auf Friedhöfen Band 4. München 2014, ISBN 978-3-938778-19-7

References

External links
 Website of the Hauptfriedhof Karlsruhe
 Information center of the Hauptfriedhof Karlsruhe

1580s architecture
Lutheran cemeteries
Cemeteries in Europe